

Codes

References

D